Hardenbergia perbrevidens is a species of flowering plant in the family Fabaceae and is endemic to Queensland. It is a twiner with slender stems, trifoliate leaves with narrowly egg-shaped to narrowly elliptic leaflets, and racemes of deep mauve to purple flowers with yellow marks.

Description
The petals are deep mauve to purple with yellow marks. This hardenbergia is similar to H. violacea, but that species has simple leaves.

Taxonomy
Hardenbergia perbrevidens was first formally described in 1985 by Rodney John Francis Henderson in the journal Austrobaileya. The specific epithet (perbrevidens) refers to the short sepal lobes.

Distribution and habitat
Hardenbergia perbrevidens is found in inland north-eastern Queensland where it grows in sandy soil.

Conservation status
This species is listed as of "least concern" under the Queensland Government Nature Conservation Act 1992.

References

Fabales of Australia
Flora of Queensland
Plants described in 1985
Phaseoleae